Vallscreek is an unincorporated community in McDowell County, West Virginia, United States. It was also known as Hartwell.

The community takes its name from nearby Vall Creek.
The town is on the Norfolk Southern Railway(former Norfolk and Western) network.

References

Unincorporated communities in McDowell County, West Virginia
Unincorporated communities in West Virginia
Coal towns in West Virginia